Serge Nigg (6 June 1924 – 12 November 2008) was a French composer, born in Paris.

Biography
After initial studies with Ginette Martenot, Nigg entered the Paris Conservatory in 1941 and studied harmony with Olivier Messiaen and counterpoint with Simone Plé-Caussade.  In 1945, he met René Leibowitz, who introduced him to the twelve-tone technique of composition. Together with other Leibowitz pupils, Antoine Duhamel, André Casanova and Jean Prodromidès, he gave the first performance of Leibowitz's Explications des Metaphors, Op. 15, in Paris in 1948. After completing a Concerto for Piano and Wind Instruments and a Concerto for Piano and String Orchestra (both 1943), and the symphonic poem Timour (1944), he became the first French composer to write a dodecaphonic work when his Variations for Piano and 10 Instruments appeared in 1946.  This piece was premiered at the International Festival of Dodecaphonic Music, organized by Leibowitz in 1947.

In 1956, Nigg was appointed a member of the Music Committee for French state broadcasting.  From 1967 to 1982, he was a member of the music management for the French Ministry of Culture, after which he taught classes in instrumentation and orchestration at the Paris Conservatory, and became President of the Société Nationale de Musique.  He was elected to the Académie des Beaux-Arts in 1989 and served as its President in 1995.

Nigg died November 12, 2008, aged 84.

Works
Concerto for Piano and Wind Instruments, 1943
Concerto for Piano and String Orchestra, 1943
Piano Sonata No. 1, 1943
Timour, symphonic poem, 1944
Variations for Piano and 10 Instruments, 1946
Four Mélodies on poems by Paul Éluard, 1950
Billiard, ballet, 1950
Pour un poète captif, symphonic poem, 1951
Concerto for Piano and Orchestra No. 1, 1954
Concerto for Violin and Orchestra, 1960
Concerto for Flute and String Orchestra, 1960
Jérôme Bosch, symphony, 1960
Histoire d'œuf, conte musical based on Blaise Cendrars, 1961
Pour un Tombeau d'Anatole, 1961
Visages d'Axël, 1965–67
Fulgur, 1970
Concerto No. 2 for Piano and Orchestra, 1971
Fastes de l'imaginaire, 1974
Mirrors for William Blake, 1979
Million d'oiseaux d'or, 1981
String Quartet
Du clair au sombre, song cycle for soprano and chamber orchestra, based on poems by Paul Éluard
Arioso for Cello und Piano, 1987
Concerto No. 1 for Viola and Orchestra, 1987–1988
Poème for orchestra, 1990
Sonata for Piano and Violin, 1996
Tumultes for piano, 1998
Deux images de nuits for piano, 1999
Concerto No. 2 for Viola and Orchestra, 2000

References

External links
 
 Serge Nigg's biography on Cdmc website

1924 births
2008 deaths
French classical composers
French male classical composers
20th-century classical composers
Members of the Académie des beaux-arts
Officers of the Ordre national du Mérite
20th-century French composers
20th-century French male musicians